Agostino Gaetano Riboldi (18 February 1839 – 25 April 1902) was an Italian cardinal of the Roman Catholic Church. He was the Bishop of Pavia from 1877 to 1901, and the Archbishop of Ravenna from 1901 to 1902. He was made a cardinal at the papal consistory held on 15 April 1901 and became the Cardinal-Priest of Santi Nereo ed Achilleo.

A street in the town of his birth, Paderno Dugnano, is named for him.

References

Additional sources

1839 births
1902 deaths
20th-century Italian cardinals
Cardinals created by Pope Leo XIII
19th-century Italian Roman Catholic bishops